Amy Kvilhaug is an American, former collegiate right-handed softball pitcher and current Head Coach originally from Taunton, Massachusetts. She is the coach at Boston College. Kvilhaug played softball at for the Providence Friars and was named the 1993 Rooke of The Year and was also a All-Big East Conference selection.

Coaching career

St. John's
In July 2006, Kvilhaug was named the eighth head coach in St. John's program history. On September 5, 2018, Kvilhaug retired as head coach, after serving as coach for 12 years. She helped lead St. John's to seven Big East tournament appearances. In 2015, she led the team to its first regular-season title win as well as its first Big East Tournament victory, and the program's first NCAA tournament appearance in 35 years. She finished her career with a record of 281–333–10.

Boston College
On July 2, 2019, Kvilhaug was named the new head coach of the Boston College Eagles softball program.

Statistics

Providence

Head coaching record
Sources:

College

References

Living people
Softball players from Massachusetts
American softball coaches
Female sports coaches
Providence Friars softball players
Boston College Eagles softball coaches
Radford Highlanders softball coaches
Providence Friars softball coaches
St. John's Red Storm softball coaches
Rutgers Scarlet Knights softball coaches
Seton Hall Pirates softball coaches
Year of birth missing (living people)